Inam Javed (born 13 November 1991) is a Pakistani cricketer. He made his first-class debut for Lahore Blues in the 2017–18 Quaid-e-Azam Trophy on 9 October 2017.

References

External links
 

1991 births
Living people
Pakistani cricketers
Place of birth missing (living people)
Lahore Blues cricketers